is a Japanese voice actress and singer from Hyōgo Prefecture who is affiliated with Animo Produce. She is known for voicing Marin Kitagawa in My Dress-Up Darling. She is also a member of the band Morfonica, a part of the multimedia franchise BanG Dream!; she voices Tōko Kirigaya in the same franchise.

Biography
Suguta was born in Hyōgo Prefecture on April 17, 1995. From an early age she had an interest in entertainment, having been a fan of the idol group Morning Musume and the singer Yui, the latter inspiring her to learn to play the acoustic guitar. During her junior high school and high school years, she became a fan of anime series such as Gin Tama, One Piece, and Free!. She also lived in Hong Kong and Singapore at her youth, and used to be fluent in English before returning to Japan.

After graduating from university, Suguta initially worked as a nursery school teacher. At the time, she was friends with Chiharu Hokaze, who had gone to the same university as her and at the time was a member of the idol group 22/7. Although Suguta had considered becoming a voice actress while in college, her friendship with Hokaze further inspired her to pursue that path.

Suguta began training at a voice acting training school run by the talent agency Amino Produce in 2017. Her first voice acting role was as the character Haruka in the mobile game Afterlost; she also became a member of the game's in-universe idol group SPR5.

Suguta became a member of the band Morfonica in 2020, serving as its guitarist; the band is a part of the multimedia franchise BanG Dream!. She was also cast as Tōko Kirigaya in the same series. In 2022, she played Marin Kitagawa in the anime television series My Dress-Up Darling. In 2023, she was a recipient of the Best New Actor Award at the 17th Seiyu Awards.

Filmography

Anime series
2019
 Rinshi!! Ekoda-chan as Tanaka-san
 Afterlost as Haruka

2020
 BanG Dream! Girls Band Party! Pico: Ohmori as Tōko Kirigaya
 Eternity: Shinya no Nurekoi Channel as Maki Kusunoki

2021
 BanG Dream! Girls Band Party! Pico Fever! as Tōko Kirigaya

2022
 My Dress-Up Darling as Marin Kitagawa
 Kotaro Lives Alone as Sawaguchi
 BanG Dream! Morfonication as Tōko Kirigaya

Anime films
2021
 BanG Dream! Film Live 2nd Stage as Tōko Kirigaya

2022
 BanG Dream! Poppin'Dream! as Tōko Kirigaya

Video games
2018
 Afterlost as Haruka

2019
 Help!!! Koi ga Oka Gakuen Otasuke-bu as Kirari Kurusu

2020
 BanG Dream! Girls Band Party! as Tōko Kirigaya
 Brown Dust as Ashley
 Kemono Friends 3 as Bergman's Bear

2022
 Kyoutou Kotoba RPG: Kotodaman as Origan

References

External links
 Agency profile 
 

1995 births
Japanese voice actresses
Living people
Seiyu Award winners
Voice actresses from Hyōgo Prefecture